White Rose Theatre was founded by playwright and director Chris Bush while at the University of York in 2005. Started as a new writing company, they currently specialise in new musical theatre, and are best known for their 2007 production TONY! The Blair Musical.

Productions
 Olympia (2005) University of York
 Man & God (2006) Smirnoff Underbelly, Edinburgh, Rotherham Arts Centre
 TONY! The Blair Musical (2007) York Theatre Royal, C Venues, Edinburgh, Pleasance, Islington
 The Ash Grove (2007) University of York
 Tony of Arabia (2008) Theatre Royal, Wakefield, North Wall, Oxford, Pleasance Dome, Edinburgh
 Lost Soul Music (2008–) C Venues, Edinburgh, Square Chapel, Halifax, Pleasance, Islington

Awards
 The Sunday Times NSDF Edinburgh Competition 2007: Winner - TONY! The Blair Musical
 MTM: Musical Theatre Matters Awards 2007: Best Ensemble TONY! The Blair Musical (nominee)
 MTM: Musical Theatre Matters Awards 2008: Best Lyrics – Chris Bush for Tony of Arabia (nominee)
 Spotlight NSDF Emerging Artists Awards 2008: Best Show - Simon Says (shortlisted)
 Spotlight NSDF Emerging Artists Awards 2008: Best Music/Lyrics - Chris Bush and Ian McCluskey for Tony of Arabia
 Spotlight NSDF Emerging Artists Awards 2008: Best Actor – James Duckworth for Simon Says (part of Lost Soul Music)
 Spotlight NSDF Emerging Artists Awards 2008: Best Writing – Chris Bush for Simon Says (part of Lost Soul Music)

External links
 White Rose Theatre website

Organizations established in 2005
2005 establishments in England
Theatre companies in the United Kingdom
Organisations based in York
Theatre in York